Chongren Road Station, is a station of Line 1 of Wuhan Metro. It entered revenue service along with the completion of Line 1, Phase 1 on July 28, 2004. It is located in Qiaokou District.

Station layout

Transfers
Bus transfers to Route 551, 622 and 808 are available at Chongren Road Station.

References

Wuhan Metro stations
Line 1, Wuhan Metro
Railway stations in China opened in 2004